Terrorizer was an extreme music magazine published by Dark Arts Ltd. in the United Kingdom. It was released every four weeks with thirteen issues a year and featured a "Fear Candy" covermount CD, a twice yearly "Fear Candy Unsigned" CD, and a double-sided poster.

History

1993
Terrorizer published its first issue in October 1993 with Sepultura on the cover and a price of £1.95. "Sure, the layout was a bit ropey, with several 'cut out'-style pictures in the live section and some horribly lo-fi video stills in the Pestilence feature, but what a line-up of bands! Sepultura, Morgoth, Entombed, Morbid Angel, At the Gates, Coroner, Dismember, Sinister, Death...it was a veritable smorgasbord of brutality."

The magazine's name derives from seminal grindcore band Terrorizer (which got the name from the death metal band Master's first demo in 1985) and as such the magazine was an early champion of the emerging death metal scene, a tradition that it carried on and expanded to include all sub-generes of heavy metal adopting the slogan "extreme music - no boundaries" in 2003 with issue 108, also the first part of the Thrash Special.

After a second issue with cover stars Carcass, the then editor, Rob Clymo, took a risk by putting Metallica on the cover which, although it caused controversy with elitists, symbolised a move towards broader musical coverage. Despite this, Terrorizer pulse remained firmly on the extreme metal underground with Cradle of Filth winning best demo and Fear Factory best newcomer in the 1993 Readers' Poll.

1994–1995
Issue 11 saw Terrorizer celebrate its first birthday, covering hardcore punk in force with features on Suicidal Tendencies, Madball, Chaos UK and Pro-Pain. "There was a sense that the team were finally properly honouring the magazine's original pledge to cover all forms of extreme music."

In 1994, death metal began to get wider acceptance in the mainstream metal press, but black metal continued to be vilified or ridiculed, or both, creating a gap that Terrorizer filled by giving pages to bands like Enslaved, Emperor and Dissection, whilst the demo reviews continued to beat the trend, getting first listens of Behemoth and Amon Amarth.

The first covermount CD, entitled Noize Pollution 3 (the first two having been cassettes), appeared on issue 23 in 1995 and featured At the Gates, Six Feet Under, In Flames, Moonspell and Dissection. That year, Terrorizer also launched two phone services, "Deathline" and "Metal Mates", that were swiftly discontinued. "The former was a number you could call to actually listen to the whole of the interviews you'd read snippets of in the magazine, and the latter where you could register your personal details with a metal matchmaking agency."

1996–1998
With issue 28 in 1996, Nick Terry replaced Rob Clymo as editor and the issue saw a Burzum artwork poster. With issue 29, the new editor overhauled and expanded the album reviews, live reviews and introduced a black metal news column. The next two years were dominated by black metal vs hardcore punk debates, as the two forces then dominant in extreme music came head-to-head in the magazine. Issue 33 also featured a demo review of Public Disturbance, a Cardiff-based hardcore band whose members would go on to form Lostprophets. In 1997, the first incarnation of the Terrorizer website was launched; Emperor, Deicide, Vader and the return of Mayhem made the covers, and hardcore continued to get heavy coverage with Integrity, Shelter, the reformed Agnostic Front and a UK HC scene report that introduced Knuckledust.

In 1998, coverage embraced both nu metal (albeit in a critical fashion), which the magazine tried to christen 'woolly hat' music, as well as more traditional fare; the former, however, saw them receive a great deal of criticism from the underground. Terrorizer also featured the last interview with Death frontman Chuck Schuldiner in issue 59. Although the next year saw the emergence of noisecore with Neurosis, Today Is the Day and The Dillinger Escape Plan, Slipknot, who would receive a cover by issue 73, got their first interview. Joey Jordison would later reveal how he had been reading the magazine since its first issue.

Terrorizer released its first cover mounted CD on its December 1998 issue and did so every four months until 2001, which it was released every two months. From 2002, every issue came with a CD.

1999–2018
Terrorizer ended 1999 with a Christmas show that saw Hecate Enthroned and Akercocke support Morbid Angel at The Astoria 2 in London. In late 2000, Jonathan Selzer replaced Nick Terry as editor and 2001 saw a doom metal revival with coverage of Cathedral and Spirit Caravan so intensive that British doom metallers Warning split up following an argument inspired by quotes in their Terrorizer interview that year.

Issue 91 saw cover placement for London-based Satanic metallers Akercocke and later coverage of emerging British black metallers Anaal Nathrakh which would culminate in the previously studio-only band headlining Terrorizer 2005 Christmas event, "A Cold Night in Hell", as their first ever live appearance. With news of Chuck Schuldiner's death, issue 97 saw him appear on the cover in tribute along with six pages inside.

For issue 116, the covermount CD changed its name from "Terrorized" (then on its 26th volume) to "Fear Candy", with some volumes given over to the yearly "Fear Candy Unsigned" (previously called "The Abominable Showcase") CD in which unsigned bands competed for an interview in the magazine. For 2006, the "Fear Candy Unsigned" was mounted on the CD along with a regular "Fear Candy". Previous entrants for the "Fear Candy Unsigned" who have since had a level of success include Season's End, a symphonic metal band now on 1 Records, zombie-themed thrash band Send More Paramedics on In at the Deep End Records, post-hardcore band Million Dead (now split-up) and avant-garde grindcore band Tangaroa on Anticulture Records.

In September 2007, Jonathan Selzer left Terrorizer for Metal Hammer, and was replaced as editor by Joseph Stannard, the magazine's news editor until that time. Subsequently the role of editor was occupied by former Rock Sound and Kerrang! staffer Darren Sadler, after previous editor Louise Brown left Terrorizer to create specialist heavy metal magazine Iron Fist. Other roles were filled by Tom Dare (web editor), Darrell Mayhew (designer), Steve Newman (designer) and notable contributors included Morat, Ronnie Kerswell-O'Hara, Olivier "Zoltar" Badin, Jose Carlos Santos, Kim Kelly, John Mincemoyer, J. Bennett, Lee Macbride, Mike Kemp, Ian Glasper and Kevin Stewart-Panko.

The magazine's last issue (287) was released in June 2018 and its publisher Dark Arts Ltd. was dissolved in January 2019. Lack of communication about the closure of Terrorizer caused controversy with subscribers who had not been informed of the impending demise. There was aditional controversy as, despite the lack of publication, subscribers were still being charged.

Genre Specials
To date Terrorizer has produced nine genre specials and one "issue" special, the Art Special, part one of the Black Metal Special being the magazine's second best selling single issue on the UK newsstands and part one of the second Prog Special.

Punk Special (#96, 2002)
Initiated to celebrate the 25th anniversary of punk hitting the mainstream with the Sex Pistols' appearance on Today with Bill Grundy, the cover featured a striking image of a spikey haired female punk and led with a feature on Alan Parker's newly released punk history, England's Dreaming, all the punk retrospectives across CD, DVD and book were compiled into one reviews spread, appropriately followed by a feature on punk reissues, a feature on anarcho-punk, the UK's DIY punk underground, the validity of US claims to 'inventing' punk versus UK claims, Oi!, hardcore punk, the punk/metal crossover, and the legacy of punk in post-punk, industrial and goth, interviews with Deadline, Sick on the Bus, Bad Religion, Alec Empire and author Stewart Home. The special ended on a list of the top 50 punk albums, which was topped by Discharge's Hear Nothing See Nothing Say Nothing.

Gore Special (#98, 2002)
With a Necrophagia cover designed to mimic the EC Comics horror titles of the 1950s, the Gore Special opened with a four-page Necrophagia interview, a Desecration interview, a Goregrind Round-Up that included Autopsy and Visceral Bleeding, a feature on cover art, censorship, horror movies and Gorerotted's own top ten.

Prog Special (#101, 2002)
Cover stars Arcturus and Opeth were photoshopped to hold the glowing covermount CD, a design that failed with the last minute change from a clear CD sleeve to a card one. The special opened with "A Brief History of Prog", an interview with Arcturus, Opeth, Ihsahn, Rush, Dream Theater and Cave In. A feature on the prog/metal crossover and a top ten.

Thrash Special (#108 & #109, 2003)
The first special to be done in multiple parts, issue 108 feature Anthrax's Scott Ian on the cover and 109 featured Nuclear Assault. The Terrorizer logo was coloured to resemble a classic thrash metal logo and the Thrash Special logo done as a patch on a denim background.

Part one started with a history of thrash, an interview with Anthrax, Overkill, Warhammer and Voivod, an overview of the global thrash metal scene, personal recollections from members of Testament, Kreator and Destruction as well as former Metal Forces editor Bernard Doe and producer Andy Sneap. Reviews of classic gigs and overview of the main labels involved.

Part two opened with cover-stars Nuclear Assault, the second part of the global thrash report, classic gigs and the personal recollections, an overview of forgotten bands, politics, thrash fashion, crossover thrash, the legacy of thrash, the art of Ed Repka and a top twenty trumped by Slayer's Reign in Blood.

Black Metal Special (#128, #129 & #130, 2005)
Opening with a striking Pete Beste image of Satyricon/1349's Frost breathing fire, the first part of the Black Metal Special opened with a brief history of black metal entitled "The Boys from the Black Stuff", a look at the black metal scene in Europe, the philosophy of black metal, the top twenty of the first wave, and a look at the black metal underground.

Part two of the black metal special began with a look at Supernatural Records, black metal labels, the scene in South America, the top twenty of the second wave, the black metal mainstream and the scene in North America. The third part contained a look at the scene in the UK and Ireland, Scandinavia, Australasia and a look at post-black metal.

Power Metal Special (#135, #136 & #137, 2005)
Part one of the Power Metal Special featured a DragonForce cover, a brief history of the genre, a look at the scene in Germany and in the UK as well as interviews with DragonForce and Dream Theater. The poster had Manowar on one side and the fantasy art of Paul Raymond Gregory on the other. Another fantasy artist, Chris Achillëos, gave a harsh blow-by-blow critique of power metal album covers.

The second part contained an interview with Stratovarius, a scene report from the USA, a look at power metal labels and selection of prominent power metal artists. The issue also contained a Judas Priest poster. Part three contained an interview with Gamma Ray and Helloween, a scene report for Europe, a top twenty and an A-to-Z of power metal themes.

Doom Special (#142, #143 & #144, 2006)
Although only the first part dominated the cover, a Black Sabbath-era image of Ozzy Osbourne, the Doom Special featured a specially compiled Bleak and Destroyed compilation CD that included classic tracks by The Obsessed, Pentagram, Candlemass, My Dying Bride, Reverend Bizarre, Witchcraft and more. Part one began with a look at Black Sabbath, a review of the entire Black Sabbath discography, a double-sided Cathedral and Wino poster, a look at 'true doom', death/doom and oral histories from Scott "Wino" Weinrich and Sunn O)))'s Greg Anderson.

The second part featured a look at the 'true doom' community, doom labels, funeral doom/drone, oral histories from Candlemass's Leif Edling, Trouble's Eric Wagner, Saint Vitus' Dave Chandler  and Cathedral's Lee Dorian. The issue also looked at stoner/sludge, doom artwork, the impact that doom had on the music world at large and posters of Electric Wizard and My Dying Bride.

Part three opened with a look at the doom scene in Maryland, Virginia and DC, themes in doom, concepts of sin and suffering in doom, forgotten doom, oral histories from Solitude's John Perez, Pentagram's Victor Griffin, My Dying Bride's Aaron Stainthorpe, and Sunn O)))/Khanate's Stephen O'Malley. Ending with a doom metal top ten for each of the main subgenres.

Death Metal Special (#148, #149, #150 & #151, 2006)
The Death Metal Special has been the largest special to date, spanning four issues. The first, with a Deicide cover, contains an extensive history of the genre, a look at the scene in Florida and Stockholm, a double-sided Morbid Angel and Deicide poster, a look at progressive death metal and oral histories from Cannibal Corpse's Alex Webster and The Haunted/At the Gates' Anders Björler.

The second part opened with an interview with Albert Mudrian, author of Choosing Death: The Improbable History of Death Metal and Grindcore, a Gothenburg scene report, an article on death metal artwork and the over-the-top sounds of Anal Cunt and Lawnmower Deth. Also included were oral histories from Immolation's Ross Dolan and Nile's Karl Sanders. The third part, the issue also including a feature on Napalm Death and a tribute to Napalm Death/Terrorizer's Jesse Pintado who died 24 August, launched with a look at the role tape-trading played in the growth of the genre, death metal in Eastern Europe (in particular, Vader, Decapitated and Behemoth), and in the UK (Carcass, Bolt Thrower, Napalm Death and Akercocke), as well as oral histories from Deicide's Glen Benton and Incantation's John McEntee before closing with an examination of the death/grind crossover.

Part four may have contained less death metal specific content than the first part, but it finished the series with an eighteen track covermount compilation CD, part sponsored by UK satellite channel Redemption TV. The CD featured a broad history of the genre, including tracks by Carcass, Repulsion, Autopsy, Morbid Angel, Deicide, Bolt Thrower, Cannibal Corpse, Entombed, Atheist, Obituary, Malevolent Creation, Nile, Suffocation, At the Gates, Cryptopsy, Dying Fetus, Hate Eternal and Behemoth. Due to licensing problems incurred by the death of Combat Records, Death and Possessed were noticeably absent. The rest of the magazine contained oral histories from Morbid Angel's Trey Azagthoth, Obituary's John Tardy and Cryptopsy's Flo Mounier, a roundtable discussion with the participating bands of the Swedish Masters of Death Tour (Dismember, Unleashed, Grave and Entombed), a look at the death metal scene in Canada, the labels that were involved in the genre's genesis and finally a death metal top 40.

Prog Special (The Return of Prog) (#161, #162 & #163 2007)
Although covered previously in 2002, then News Editor Joseph Stannard felt that progressive rock needed another go, kick-starting a three part Prog Special. Issue 161, to date the best selling issue of the magazine, featured Rush, Sean Malone, a feature on Prog into Metal, Oral Histories with Voivod's Away, Van der Graaf Generator's Peter Hammill, Jethro Tull's Ian Anderson, Zombi's AE Paterra and Genesis's Steve Hackett. Issue 162 contained an interview with Aghora, a feature on progressive rock art and a top ten album sleeves, Oral Histories with Dream Theater's Mike Portnoy and James Labrie, Akercocke's Jason Mendoca and The Nice's Davy O'List. Bringing up the rear was an article on progressive hardcore and forgotten classics of prog. Issue 163 concluded the special with Oral Histories from Jesu's Justin Broadrick and former Yes man Rick Wakeman, features on krautrock, Lee Dorrian's sizeable record collection, the Satanic prog of Coven and others, as well as "Twenty Essential '70s Prog Albums". Positive feedback for the special was registered both in the letters page and in a later feature conducted with Opeth's Mikael Åkerfeldt.

Terrorizer Online
Launched in the autumn of 2007, Terrorizer Online is a weekly ezine characterised by a more personal and irreverent tone, frequently introduced by various members of the editorial team directly. In addition to this, the newsletter features exclusive content, ranging from reviews to alternative versions of lead features such as Down, Apocalyptica, Today Is the Day, Dam, Testament, Cannibal Corpse, Pestilence and completely original interviews with Massacre, Finntroll, The Locust, Sepultura, Bad Brains, Wintersun and Iced Earth.

John Peel
British radio DJ John Peel, famously a champion of death metal and grindcore, mentioned the magazine in an episode of Home Truths on BBC Radio 4. "...I took several copies of a music magazine called 'Terrorizer' out of my luggage before leaving for New Zealand via Los Angeles in 2002 and given the hostility of the officials we encountered in California I'd say we did the right thing..."

Writers
Terrorizer pool of writers included former Stampin' Ground bassist Ian Glasper, who has also written three books on UK punk, Burning Britain: The History of UK Punk, 1980–1984, The Day the Country Died: A History of Anarcho Punk 1980–1984 and Trapped in a Scene: UK Hardcore 1985–1989, former Cradle of Filth keyboard player Damien (aka Greg Moffitt), comedy writer and Moss drummer Chris Chantler and guest columns from Fenriz, Today Is the Day's Steve Austin, Amon Amarth's Johan Hegg, Brutal Truth's Kevin Sharp and The Haunted's Peter Dolving.

References

External links
The Terrorizer website
The official Terrorizer profile on Myspace
The Terrorizer forum

1993 establishments in the United Kingdom
2018 disestablishments in the United Kingdom
British heavy metal music
Defunct magazines published in the United Kingdom
Heavy metal publications
Magazines established in 1993
Magazines disestablished in 2018
Monthly magazines published in the United Kingdom
Music magazines published in the United Kingdom